Prior to its uniform adoption of proportional representation in 1999, the United Kingdom used first-past-the-post for the European elections in England, Scotland and Wales. The European Parliament constituencies used under that system were smaller than the later regional constituencies and only had one Member of the European Parliament each.

The constituency of Herefordshire and Shropshire was one of them.

It consisted of the Westminster Parliament constituencies (on their 1983 boundaries) of Hereford, Leominster, Ludlow, North Shropshire, Shrewsbury and Atcham, The Wrekin, and Wyre Forest.

David Hallam of the Labour Party was the sole MEP for this constituency's entire existence.  His narrow election in 1994 over the Conservative incumbent Christopher Prout was somewhat of an upset; the area had been widely assumed to be safely Conservative.

MEPs

Election results

References

External links
 David Boothroyd's United Kingdom Election Results 

European Parliament constituencies in England (1979–1999)
Politics of Herefordshire
Politics of Shropshire
1994 establishments in England
1999 disestablishments in England
Constituencies established in 1994
Constituencies disestablished in 1999